Charles Barney may refer to:

 Charles D. Barney (1844–1945), American stockbroker
 Charles T. Barney (1851–1907), President of the Knickerbocker Trust Company
 Charles L. Barney (1874–1913), American football player and strongman
 Charles Neal Barney (1875–1949), Massachusetts politician

See also
 Charles Barney Hicks (died 1902), blackface minstrel performers